Pavilion Township is a civil township of Kalamazoo County in the U.S. state of Michigan. The population was 6,222 at the 2010 census, up from 5,829 at the 2000 census.

Geography
The township is in central Kalamazoo County and is bordered to the west by the city of Portage. The city of Kalamazoo touches the northwest corner of the township. Several lakes occupy the township, the largest of which are Long Lake on the western border and Indian Lake on the southern border.

Demographics
As of the census of 2000, there were 5,829 people, 2,114 households, and 1,644 families residing in the township. The racial makeup of the township was 95.61% White, 1.13% African American, 0.45% Native American, 0.29% Asian, 0.03% Pacific Islander, 0.65% from other races, and 1.84% from two or more races. Hispanic or Latino of any race were 2.08% of the population.

There were 2,114 households, out of which 38.6% had children under the age of 18 living with them, 63.4% were married couples living together, 10.0% had a female householder with no husband present, and 22.2% were non-families. 17.1% of all households were made up of individuals, and 4.9% had someone living alone who was 65 years of age or older.  The average household size was 2.75 and the average family size was 3.08.

In the township the population was spread out, with 28.5% under the age of 18, 7.0% from 18 to 24, 30.6% from 25 to 44, 24.7% from 45 to 64, and 9.2% who were 65 years of age or older.  The median age was 36 years. For every 100 females, there were 98.9 males.  For every 100 females age 18 and over, there were 97.4 males.

The median income for a household in the township was $46,675, and the median income for a family was $52,135. Males had a median income of $39,773 versus $28,340 for females. The per capita income for the township was $20,351.  About 5.6% of families and 7.5% of the population were below the poverty line, including 8.9% of those under age 18 and 4.7% of those age 65 or over.

References

External links
Official website

Townships in Kalamazoo County, Michigan
Kalamazoo–Portage metropolitan area
Townships in Michigan